Black fungus may refer to:

Mucormycosis, an infection of sinuses, brain, lungs or other areas informally known as "black fungus" and sometimes associated with COVID-19
Wood ear, several species of edible fungus known as black fungus
Boletus aereus, an edible mushroom known as ontto beltza (black fungus) in Basque
Black yeast, a group of slow-growing microfungi with melanin in their cell walls

See also
Black fungus beetle, a species of darkling beetle
Black fungus moth, a moth found in the United States
Black fungus gnat, (Asindulum nigrum), a species of fly